† Neoplanorbis umbilicatus was a species of air-breathing freshwater snail, an aquatic pulmonate gastropod mollusk in the family Planorbidae, the ram's horn snails.

This species was endemic to the United States. It is now extinct.
The shells of this species appear to be dextral in coiling, but as is the case in all planorbids, the shell is actually sinistral. The shell was carried upside down with the aperture on the right, and this makes it appear to be dextral.

References

Planorbidae
Extinct gastropods
Gastropods described in 1908
Taxonomy articles created by Polbot